The Eparchy of Piana degli Albanesi is a eparchy (diocese) of the Italo-Albanian Catholic Church, Eastern Catholic sui iuris of Byzantine Rite, covering the island of Sicily in Italy.

History 
On 6 February 1784, was established the Ordinariate of Silicia, the first jurisdiction with on ordinary for this particular church sui iuris, and appointed to it the first titular bishop of the Byzantine Rite for the Albanians of Sicily: Giorgio Stassi, Titular Bishop of Lampsacus. Before, the Albanians faithful and their Orthodox priests they had no right and were at risk in assimilation in the Roman rite.
 
On 26 October 1937, the Eparchy of Piana dei Greci was created by promoting the Ordinariate of Silicia and transferring to it territories from the Metropolitan Archdiocese of Palermo and Metropolitan Archdiocese of Monreale (both on Sicily).
 
On 25 October 1941, the Eparchy (Diocese) of Piana dei Greci was renamed as Eparchy of Piana degli Abanesi / Eparkia or Eparhia e Horës së Arbëreshëvet.

Territory 
The Eparchy of Piana degli Albanesi includes the comunes in province of Palermo: Contessa Entellina, Mezzojuso, Palazzo Adriano, Piana degli Albanesi and Santa Cristina Gela.

The eparchy see is the town of Piana degli Albanesi, where the Cathedral of Saint Demetrius the Martyr is located.

In Palermo, there is the Co-Cathedral of Saint Nicolas "dei Greci" to Martorana. 

The territory is divided into 15 parishes.

Ordinaries of Italia continentale of the Italo-Albanese Catholic Church
 Giorgio Stassi † (25 June 1784 – 26 March 1802 deceased)
 Giuseppe Guzzetta † (March 29 1802 – 1813 deceased)
 Francesco Chiarchiaro † (23 September 1813 – 1834 deceased)
 Giuseppe Crispi † (20 December 1835 – 1859 deceased)
 Agostino Franco † (1860 – 1877 deceased)
 Giuseppe Masi † (29 January 1878 – 11 April 1903 died)
 Paolo Schirò † (5 February 1904 – 12 September 1941 deceased)

The bishops ordered from the Albanians of Sicily have been nominated for those Calabria:
 Agostino Franco † (1858–1859) from Mezzojuso
 Giuseppe Schirò † (30 July 1889 – 29 November 1896) from Contessa Entellina
 Giovanni Barcia † (24 April 1902 – 1912) from Palazzo Adriano

Bishops of Sicily
 Luigi Lavitrano † (26 October 1937 – 20 December 1946 resigned) (apostolic administrator)
 Ernesto Ruffini † (3 January 1947 – 11 June 1967 deceased) (apostolic administrator)
 Giuseppe Perniciaro † (12 July 1967 – 31 May 1981 resigned)
 Ercole Lupinacci † (25 March 1981 – 30 November 1987 appointed Eparchy of Eparchia Di Lungro / Lungro degli Italo-Albanesi)
 Sotìr Ferrara † (15 October 1988 – 8 April 2013 retired)
 Paolo Romeo (8 April 2013 – 31 March 2015) (apostolic administrator)
 Giorgio Demetrio Gallaro (31 March 2015 – 25 February 2020 appointed secretary of Congregation for the Oriental Churches)

See also 
Arbëreshë people

References

External links 

 Eparchy Official site 
 http://www.acioc-milano.org Italian Cultural Association for the Christian East – Milano Section  
 GCatholic with incumbent bio links
 Catholic Hierarchy page
 Gentracer site (English)

Eastern Catholic dioceses in Europe
Italo-Albanian Catholic Church
Eastern Catholic dioceses in Italy
Christian organizations established in 1937
1937 establishments in Italy